Zelyonaya Roshcha is a rural locality (a selo) in Slavgorod, Altai Krai, Russia. The population was 3 in 2013. There are two streets.

References 

Rural localities in Slavgorod urban okrug